Zhou Lin (born February 4, 1981) is a retired Chinese football player as a defender.

Club career

Chongqing Lifan
Zhou Lin began his professional football career when he was able to break into the Chongqing Lifan first-team during the 1999 league season after previously playing for their youth team. Under head coach Lee Jang-Soo he was able to quickly establish himself within the team and even help Chongqing win the 2000 Chinese FA Cup, however once Lee Jang-Soo left Chongqing found themselves struggling to remain within the top tier. Despite Chongqing constantly struggling within the league and several managerial changes Zhou Lin would still remain a constant regular first-team member within the team until Chongqing were finally relegated in the 2006 league season and were willing to let Zhou Lin leave the club.

Guangzhou Pharmaceutical
He would move to second-tier side Guangzhou Pharmaceutical at the beginning of the 2007 league season where he would quickly become an integral member of the team that won the league and gain promotion to the Chinese Super League. Returning to the top tier Zhou Lin immediately helped establish Guangzhou within the league and saw them finish middle of the table. The following season was, however, to prove more difficult for him as head coach Shen Xiangfu preferred using different defenders that saw his playing time limited. Nevertheless, he was still given the chance to play against Beijing Guoan F.C. on June 28, 2009, but his performance was extremely disappointing and the game ended in a 1–1 draw that saw the vice-captain Xu Liang publicly criticize his performance. This would see infighting between the two breakout and while Shen Xiangfu tried to end the infighting Zhou was frozen out of the team. At the end of the season both Xu Liang and Shen Xiangfu left the club, however despite this he was allowed to leave the club once his contract ended.

Club career stats
Last update: 30 October 2010

Honours
Chongqing Lifan
Chinese FA Cup: 2000
Guangzhou Pharmaceutical
China League One: 2007, 2010

References

External links
 Player stats at sohu.com
 Player profile at football-lineups.com

1981 births
Living people
Chinese footballers
Footballers from Tianjin
Chongqing Liangjiang Athletic F.C. players
Guangzhou F.C. players
Footballers at the 2002 Asian Games
Chinese Super League players
China League One players
Association football defenders
Asian Games competitors for China